Figaro e la sua gran giornata (in English, Figaro and his Great Day) is a 1931 Italian comedy film directed by Mario Camerini and starring Gianfranco Giachetti, Leda Gloria and Ugo Ceseri.

It was shot at the Cines Studios in Rome. The film's sets were designed by the art directors Gastone Medin and Ivo Perilli.

Synopsis
In a small town in the Veneto region, an attempt to stage Rossini's The Barber of Seville is threatened when the prima donna loses her voice. An attempt is made to replace her with a singing student, but both her father and boyfriend object.

Cast
 Gianfranco Giachetti as Piero Basoto 
 Leda Gloria as Nina 
 Ugo Ceseri as Rantoloni, l'impresario 
 Maurizio D'Ancora as Asdrubale Chiodini 
 Umberto Sacripante as Gedeone, il portaceste 
 Olga Capri as Caterina, la fantesca 
 Gemma Schirato as Costanza Basoto 
 Augusto Bandini as Il maestro Salsuga 
 Umberto Cocchi as Felicetti, il farmacista 
 Giuseppe Gambardella as Gargaturi, il basso 
 Achille Majeroni as Il padre di Nina 
 Alfredo Martinelli as Sivoloni, il basso 
 Angelo Parigi as Il tenore Pancrazi 
 Carlo Ranieri as Un membro del circolo 
 Raimondo Van Riel as Un delegato di polizia 
 Gino Viotti as Il sindaco

References

Bibliography 
 Carlo Celli & Margo Cottino-Jones. A New Guide to Italian Cinema. Springer, 2007.

External links 
 

1931 films
Italian historical comedy films
Italian black-and-white films
1930s historical comedy films
1930s Italian-language films
Films directed by Mario Camerini
Cines Studios films
Films set in the 19th century
1931 comedy films
1930s Italian films